Alyssa Bull (born 1 December 1995) is an Australian canoeist. She qualified to represent Australia at the 2020 Summer Olympics. Bull was unable to make the final of the women's K-1 500m being knocked out in the semi-final. Bull paired with Alyce Wood in the Women's K-2 500m. They made it to the final and finished fifth.

Early years
At the age of 16 Bull started ski paddling for surf lifesaving. In 2012 she was the Under 17 Australian Ironwoman Champion. Inspired after watching her surf lifesaving idol Naomi Flood compete at London 2012, Bull took up kayaking.

Bull was also surf lifesaving and competed in the 2012/13 and 2013/14 Ironwoman series.

Achievements
Bull achieved her childhood dream when she made her Olympic debut at the 2016 Summer Olympics in Rio . She competed in the women's K-2 500 metres event .

Bull also competed with K-2 partner Alyce Wood. The pair won both K-2 selection events, defeating their idol Naomi Flood and her partner Olympian Jo Brigden-Jones. This was a major upset. They then made the A-Finals of the K-2 500m by finishing third in their semi-final. In the final they came eighth and finished with a time of 1min 51.915sec.

References

External links
 

1995 births
Living people
Australian female canoeists
Olympic canoeists of Australia
Canoeists at the 2016 Summer Olympics
Place of birth missing (living people)
Canoeists at the 2020 Summer Olympics
ICF Canoe Sprint World Championships medalists in kayak